Robert Meadows (born 25 April 1938) is an English retired professional footballer who played in the Football League for Doncaster Rovers as a full back.

Career statistics

References 

1938 births
Living people
Sportspeople from Melton Mowbray
Footballers from Leicestershire
Association football fullbacks
English footballers
Stoke City F.C. players
Northwich Victoria F.C. players
Doncaster Rovers F.C. players
Bangor City F.C. players
Macclesfield Town F.C. players
Stafford Rangers F.C. players
Nantwich Town F.C. players
English Football League players